MacPherlin Dudu Omagbemi (born 18 July 1987, in Lagos, Nigeria), commonly known as Dudu, is a Nigerian footballer.

Career
Dudu started his career in India in 2001. He is the most tenacious player India has ever seen. When playing in the Indian Football League he had many great successes with Sporting Clube de Goa even becoming the league's top goalscorer. During his time in India he was involved in a scandal when he signed a contract with two different clubs simultaneously; one with SC Goa and another one with Mahindra United. The issue was later settled between the two clubs. He also had few other disputes with SC Goa later on concerning similar incidents.

The charismatic football player rejected the 2008 Olympic call-up to put his career back on track and on 5 August 2008 he joined the 3 time Hungarian champion Debreceni VSC.

In August 2010 Dudu signed a contract with Finnish Division Two club FC OPA from where he was loaned out to Finnish Premier League side KuPS. In October 2010 Dudu signed a contract for the 2011 season with another Veikkausliiga team FC Honka. On 4 August 2012, he signed a contract until autumn 2013 with KuPS. On 4 August 2014, Dudu signed for I-League side Kingfisher East Bengal for a one-year deal.

On 1 September 2016, he joined Chennaiyin FC. On 26 November, he scored a brilliant hat-trick against North East United FC.

On 6 January 2018, Dudu joined East Bengal of I-League. He made his first appearance of the season in the Kolkata Derby on 21 January 2018 which East Bengal lost by a 0-2 margin. He found the net near the end of the added-time to help East Bengal beat Indian Arrows by a solitary goal, which was the first goal from the Nigerian striker, who returned to East Bengal after three seasons as a midseason replacement for injured Willis Plaza. He then  scored 4 times when Chennai City was massacred 7-1 by Kingfisher East Bengal.

In January 2020, after one and a half year without club, Dudu returned to Swedish club Oskarshamns AIK. The club confirmed on 15 April 2020, that he had left the club again to return to Finland, where his family was. He then joined Mikkelin Palloilijat on 25 August 2020.

Honours

Sporting Clube de Goa

 2.Division: 2002–03

Wisła Kraków

Ekstraklasa: 2007–08

Debreceni VSC

NB I: 2008/09
Hungarian Super Cup: 2009

FC Honka
 Finnish League Cup: 2011

Individual

NFL Golden Boot: 2004–05

References

External links
 

1985 births
Living people
Sportspeople from Lagos
Nigerian footballers
Association football forwards
Nigerian expatriate footballers
Dempo SC players
Salgaocar FC players
Penang F.C. players
Wisła Kraków players
Debreceni VSC players
Kecskeméti TE players
Kuopion Palloseura players
FC Honka players
Sporting Clube de Goa players
FC Pune City players
FC Goa players
Chennaiyin FC players
East Bengal Club players
Oskarshamns AIK players
Mikkelin Palloilijat players
Nemzeti Bajnokság I players
Ekstraklasa players
Veikkausliiga players
I-League players
Indian Super League players
Ykkönen players
Ettan Fotboll players
Nigerian expatriate sportspeople in Hungary
Nigerian expatriate sportspeople in Poland
Nigerian expatriate sportspeople in Malaysia
Nigerian expatriate sportspeople in India
Nigerian expatriate sportspeople in Sweden
Nigerian expatriate sportspeople in Finland
Expatriate footballers in Hungary
Expatriate footballers in Poland
Expatriate footballers in Malaysia
Expatriate footballers in India
Expatriate footballers in Sweden
Expatriate footballers in Finland